Ari Peltonen (born ), also known by the mononyms Paska and Anssi, is a Finnish radio persona, a cappella rock singer, reporter, writer, and television host.

Musical career
In 1985, Peltonen took part in the pre-qualification of the Finnish Rock Championship as a one-man a capella band called "Paska". The band performed music consisting solely of Peltonen's shouting. A debut EP, named Superdoublemegamaxihits!, was released in 1989. Over the following years, Paska performed in some fifty international venues, including Germany, Mexico, France, the Soviet Union, and the United States. In 2015, Billboard magazine highligted Paska's cover of Motörhead's "Ace of Spades" as "one of the weirdest, most deconstructed versions out there". The band "broke up" in the 1990s due to "musical differences", and returned briefly in 2005.

Radio and television career
Peltonen transitioned to radio in 1989, hosting Paskalista on Radio City. The show consisted of Peltonen's renditions of the Finnish top-ten singles chart. He soon began hosting a show called ANSSI! on Yle's Radiomafia. The show became a subject of criticism following a TV special report, and the coarse language of the show was brought up at least two times in the Finnish parliament. As a result, the show was initially suspended but later allowed to resume pre-taped. Another of Peltonen's shows, Vihatut levyt, consisted of listener-submitted music that they least wanted to hear.

The entertainer has also appeared on television. In 2008, he hosted Paskareissu on Sub TV. The show investigated some of the "worst" Finnish municipalities.

Reporter and writer
In addition to his career as a musician and presenter, Peltonen has worked as a reporter for City magazine and Helsingin Sanomat.

He has authored five books.

Other activities
In 2006, Peltonen claimed to have founded a  micronation called  in Lapland on a plot of land owned by his reporter colleague Ilkka Malmberg. The microstate was the subject of multiple stories in Helsingin Sanomats supplemental NYT and was "occupied" in 2007 by reporters of the Finnish Defence Forces' Ruotuväki magazine.

Discography
 Superdoublemegamaxihits! (EP, 1989)
 Buy Play Throw Away (EP, 1989)
 Heterosapiens (EP, 1997)
 Christmas Album (EP, 2002)
 Women Are from Venus, Men from Anus (2005)

Notes

References

 
 
 
 
 
 
 
 
 
 

Finnish musical groups
Finnish comedy musicians
Musical groups established in 1985